{
  "type": "FeatureCollection",
  "features": [
    {
      "type": "Feature",
      "properties": {},
      "geometry": {
        "type": "Point",
        "coordinates": [
          37.55813598632813,
          -0.44631506635707663
        ]
      }
    }
  ]
}

Runyenjes is the second largest town in Embu County, Kenya. It is located about 150 km from Nairobi, and 75 km from Mount Kenya, at an altitude of 1500m.The population is estimated at 58,000 people, the majority of which are of the Embu People who speak Kiembu, a Bantu language, as well as Kiswahili and English, the two official languages in Kenya. The area offers scenic views, with densely wooded hills, gentle valleys, flowing streams and rivers, waterfalls, as well as small-scale farms.

Etymology
Runyenjes derives its name from a popular Chief Runyenje of the colonial era who ruled from Thuci River to Sagana.

Geography 

Runyenjes is located at an altitude of 1495.62 m (4906.89 ft) and lies on the windward side of Mt. Kenya. It is about 150 km from Nairobi city and about 25 km from Embu town along the Nairobi-Meru-Isiolo road. The road from Runyenjes to Nairobi is tarmacked and well-maintained. A drive along this road from Runyenjes  town towards Embu-Nairobi offers scenic views of the Karue and Kirimiri hills, nearby waterfalls and, on a clear sky, a great view of Mt. Kenya. The section of this road from Runyenjes town to Meru town via Chuka town is also quite scenic offering views ranging from densely wooded hills, gentle valleys, flowing streams and rivers, as well as, tea and coffee small-scale farms.

According to Google maps, you can walk non-stop from Runyenjes town to the top of Mt. Kenya in approximately 18 hr 31 min, a distance of about 74 km.

Towns surrounding or nearby Runyenjes include Kianjokoma, Karurumo, Kigumo, Kathageri, Mukuuri, Kanja, Mufu, Rukuriri, Ena, Gichiche, Kathanjuri, Kyeni, Makutano, Kiaragana and Nthagaiya.

Demographics 
The population of Runyenjes is estimated to be 58,000 people, majority of which are of the Embu People heritage and speak Kiembu, a Bantu language, as well as Kiswahili and English, the two official languages in Kenya.

Government 
Runyenjes serves as constituency and municipality.

Religion 
Similar to the rest of Embu county, most of the residents identify as Christians. There are several major Christian denominations churches located in or around the municipality, including but not limited to, the Anglican Church of Kenya, The Roman Catholic Church of Kenya, SDA Church and the Salvation Army Church. Well known church buildings include ACK St. Philips Rukuriri, St. Joseph Mukasa Catholic Church Mbiruri among many others.

References 

Embu County
Populated places in Kenya